Stone Mountain Freeway is a freeway in the north-central part of the U.S. state of Georgia. It connects Interstate 285 (I-285) east of Atlanta, with the suburbs of Stone Mountain and Snellville before transitioning into an arterial road that continues to Athens. The freeway is signed as U.S. Route 78 (US 78) for its entire length, with the western half signed as State Route 410 (SR 410), and the eastern half also being signed as SR 10. It begins at the US 29/US 78 split northeast of Decatur, and continues east through eastern DeKalb and southern Gwinnett counties.

Route description

Stone Mountain Freeway begins at an interchange with US 29/SR 8 (Lawrenceville Highway) on the Scottdale–North Decatur city line, within DeKalb County. There is no access to US 29/SR 8 north from Stone Mountain Freeway or to Stone Mountain Freeway from US 29/SR 8 south. Southwest of this interchange, US 29/US 78/SR 8 head toward Decatur. Stone Mountain Freeway travels to the northeast, concurrent with US 78 and SR 410. The concurrency has a partial interchange with Valley Brook Road and North Druid Hills Road. Just before leaving Scottdale is an interchange with Interstate 285 (I-285). Part of this interchange is within the city limits of Clarkston. The two highways travels to the north of Clarkston and enter Tucker. They have an interchange with Brockett Road and Cooledge Road and then Mountain Industrial Boulevard. After leaving Tucker, they have an interchange with SR 10 (Memorial Drive). At this interchange, SR 410 meets its eastern terminus, and SR 10 begins a concurrency with US 78 and Stone Mountain Freeway. They have an interchange with SR 236 (Hugh Howell Road). A little bit later is an access road to Stone Mountain Park's main entrance. Right after the park, the highways enter Gwinnett County and have a partial interchange with Park Place Boulevard and Rockbridge Road. Just to the east of this interchange, the freeway ends and US 78/SR 10 continue to the east, locally known as Stone Mountain Highway.

Unlike Georgia's Interstate highways, the highway still has actual sequential exit numbers, rather than being mileage-based. There is no exit 6, which makes the exit numbering non-sequential; the former Exit 6 was the back entrance to Stone Mountain Park via Old Hugh Howell Road, previously open for major events only.

All of Stone Mountain Freeway is included as part of the National Highway System, a system of roadways important to the nation's economy, defense, and mobility.

History
Stone Mountain Freeway was under construction in 1967 along the same alignment as it travels today. By 1970, the highway was completed.

Controversy

The Stone Mountain Freeway shares state route number 10 with Freedom Parkway, a  road in central Atlanta that connects with the Interstate Highway System at a major interchange on I-75/I-85 (the Downtown Connector). As that designation suggests, state officials originally intended the Stone Mountain Freeway to continue west, through Decatur, Druid Hills, and Candler Park, to downtown Atlanta. In pursuit of those plans, in 1969, the GDOT purchased an X-shaped swath of land designed to carry two roads: I-485, traveling from west to east, and another freeway connecting what are now SR 400 to the north and I-675 to the south.

Neighborhood groups and local preservationists worked together to block road construction of the highways. After 20 years of litigation and political maneuvering, community groups and state and local officials in 1991 compromised and set much of the state-purchased right-of-way aside as parkland, later named Freedom Park. The land proposed as the interchange of the two cancelled highways, by then, had become the site of the Carter Center.

Freedom Parkway – the last vestige of the planned downtown link of the Stone Mountain Freeway – opened in 1994.

Exit list

See also

References

External links

Roads in Georgia (U.S. state)
Freeways in the United States
U.S. Route 78
Transportation in DeKalb County, Georgia
Transportation in Gwinnett County, Georgia
Stone Mountain